A Festa dos Seus Sonhos (lit.: The Party of Your Dreams) is a live video album recorded during the special, one year anniversary concert of Brazilian pop girl group Rouge released on DVD on December 3, 2003. The show was held at the Pacaembu Stadium on September 23, 2003, and gathered around 30,000 people.

Track listing

Bonus
The DVD also includes the Rouge girls teaching the choreographies of their most famous songs like Ragatanga, Não Dá pra Resistir, Brilha La Luna, Beijo Molhado, Me Faz Feliz, Vem Cair na Zueira and C'est La Vie. And also two video clips of Brilha La Luna and Um Anjo Veio Me Falar.

Awards
The DVD received two awards, in "Capricho Awards 2004" and "Troféu Universo Musical 2004", in addition to being nominated for "Multishow Brazilian Music Award", all in the category "Best DVD".

Certifications

Notes

Rouge (group) albums
Live albums by Brazilian artists
Portuguese-language video albums
Live video albums
2003 video albums